On the Road to Timbuktu: Explorers in Africa is a 1999 documentary film adapted from French historian Anne Hugon's nonfiction book of the same name. Directed by Jean-Claude Lubtchansky, and co-produced by Trans Europe Film, La Sept-Arte and Éditions Gallimard, with voice-over narration by French actors François Marthouret, and German actor Richard Sammel. The film follows in the footsteps of Mungo Park, René Caillié and Heinrich Barth, the three explorers who have become legends both in Europe and in Africa.

The documentary was broadcast on Arte on 6 November 1999, as part of the channel's television programme The Human Adventure. It has been dubbed into German, however, it is unclear whether the film is available in English.

Synopsis 
But the scientific and geographical curiosity of the last century's Enlightenment movement, brought forth a new type of adventurers: the explorers, whose purpose was to inform their contemporaries about the kaleidoscope of cultures and civilisations on this planet. Among them, Mungo Park, René Caillié and Heinrich Barth, have become legends in Europe for their expeditions and discoveries in inner and western Africa.

Introduction 
A permanent connection between the past and the present, history, memory and reality. Combining illustrations (maps, engravings, paintings), archive photos and scenes filmed on location, "it's a work on the fringe of the real and the imaginary", explains the filmmaker, a method inspired by the pictorial richness of "Découvertes" books.

The book

Introduction 
The book , on which the film is based, is an illustrated monograph on history of the European exploration of Timbuktu, inner and western Africa, published in pocket format by Éditions Gallimard on 14 September 1994. Written by the French Africanist and historian Anne Hugon, this work is the  volume in the encyclopaedic collection "Découvertes Gallimard", and part of the collection's  series (formerly belonging to  series). It's also a sequel of The Exploration of Africa: From Cairo to the Cape ("Découvertes" No. 117). Together, they form a "miniseries"——in the collection.

According to the tradition of "Découvertes", which is based on an abundant pictorial documentation and a way of bringing together visual documents and texts, enhanced by printing on coated paper; in other words, "genuine monographs, published like art books".

While many of the French titles from the collection make it into English, this book has never been translated.

Synopsis 
The book concentrates on Timbuktu, an ancient city in Mali, in West Africa, a region which the preceding work From Cairo to the Cape has nothing on it.

For Europeans, Timbuktu was a mythical city in the heart of the Sahara. In 1795, Mungo Park acknowledged the Niger River. Thirty years later, René Caillié entered this "forbidden city", while Hugh Clapperton explored Lake Chad, Heinrich Barth crossed the Sahara... Travellers discovered the powerful dynasties of West Africa. Since 1850, the new explorers were mostly colonial officers with mission of conquest. On the eve of the World War I, despite African nationalism, Europeans managed to create genuine empires in Africa.

See also 
 Mali Empire
 Scramble for Africa
 Colonisation of Africa

References

External links 
 On the Road to Timbuktu: Explorers in Africa (the film) on Africine.org 
 Vers Tombouctou : L'Afrique des explorateurs II (the book) at Éditions Gallimard 

1999 documentary films
1999 films
French documentary television films
Documentary films about Africa
Films based on non-fiction books
Films shot in Mali
Découvertes Gallimard
1994 non-fiction books
20th-century history books
Books about Africa
History books about exploration
Works about the European colonisation in Africa
Exploration of Africa
Timbuktu in popular culture
1990s French films